The Royal Guard of Bahrain is a unit of the Bahrain Defence Force. In June 2011, King Hamad appointed his 24-year-old son Nasser bin Hamad Al Khalifa as the commander of the Royal Guard.

Opposition political leader Ali Salman claimed in 2009 that "no Shi'ites have been recruited to work in the Royal Guard even though they make up over half of the population."

References

See also
 National Guard (Bahrain)
 Royal Guard

Military of Bahrain
Bahrain Defence Force
Bahrain